In the geologic timescale, the Valanginian is an age or stage of the Early or Lower Cretaceous. It spans between 139.8 ± 3.0 Ma and 132.9 ± 2.0 Ma (million years ago). The Valanginian Stage succeeds the Berriasian Stage of the Lower Cretaceous and precedes the Hauterivian Stage of the Lower Cretaceous.

Stratigraphic definitions
The Valanginian was first described and named by Édouard Desor in 1853. It is named after Valangin, a small town north of Neuchâtel in the Jura Mountains of Switzerland.

The base of the Valanginian is at the first appearance of calpionellid species Calpionellites darderi in the stratigraphic column. A global reference section (a GSSP) had in 2009 not yet been appointed.

The top of the Valanginian (the base of the Hauterivian) is at the first appearance of the ammonite genus Acanthodiscus.

Subdivision
The Valanginian is often subdivided in Lower and Upper substages. The Upper substage begins at the first appearance of ammonite species Saynoceras verrucosum and the major marine transgression Va3.

In the Tethys domain, the Valanginian stage contains five ammonite biozones:

 zone of Criosarasinella furcillata
 zone of Neocomites peregrinus
 zone of Saynoceras verrucosum
 zone of Busnardoites campylotoxus
 zone of Tirnovella pertransiens

Flora
The oldest fossils that can definitely be attributed to the clade Angiospermae (flowering plants) are dated to the Late Valanginian.

References

Notes

Literature
; (2004): A Geologic Time Scale 2004, Cambridge University Press.

External links
GeoWhen Database - Valanginian
Mid-Cretaceous timescale and ühttp://stratigraphy.science.purdue.edu/charts/Timeslices/5_JurCret.pdf Jurassic-Cretaceous timescale], at the website of the subcommission for stratigraphic information of the ICS
Stratigraphic chart of the Lower Cretaceous, at the website of Norges Network of offshore records of geology and stratigraphy

 
02
Geological ages
Cretaceous geochronology